Pedro Medina is the name of:

Pedro Medina (baseball)
Pedro Medina (murderer)
Pedro Medina (sport shooter)
Pedro Medina Avendaño